Karl Kevin Quiambao (born April 22, 2001) is a Filipino college basketball player for the De La Salle Green Archers of the University Athletic Association of the Philippines (UAAP). He has won championships in the juniors division of the UAAP, and has played for the Philippine national team multiple times.

Early life 
Quiambao's father and grandfather taught him how to play basketball, and he also looked up to the likes of Ryan Buenafe and Marc Pingris. He played in barangay leagues growing up.

High school career

Lyceum Junior Pirates 
Quiambao was recruited to play for the Lyceum Junior Pirates after he was noticed at a barangay league. He didn't make the roster for two years, instead spending time with Lyceum's Team B. During this time, Coach LA Mumar encouraged him to pattern his game after Nikola Jokić.

NU Bullpups 
In 2016, Quiambao tried out for the Bullpups, where Coach Goldwin Monteverde took him in. He often had workouts with NU Lady Bulldogs star player Jack Animam.

Season 81: First championship 
Before the start of Season 81, NU successfully captured the ASEAN School Games title, in which they swept the competition in four games.

In a Season 81 win over the UST Tiger Cubs, Quiambao led the team with 13 points, eight rebounds, two assists and two blocks.  In the second round of eliminations, he had 10 points and seven rebounds in a win over the Ateneo Blue Eaglets.  He then had a double-double of 10 points and 11 rebounds in a 51-point win over the UPIS Junior Maroons. They went on to sweep the second round. They met Ateneo again in the Finals, where in Game 1, he had 14 points and 13 rebounds to lead NU to the win. With Carl Tamayo, they combined for 29 points and 25 rebounds and limited Ateneo's star center Kai Sotto to just 16 points. In Game 2, he had an all-around performance of eight points, six boards, five assists, and two blocks, and NU won the juniors' championship for the first time since 2016.

Season 82: Second championship 
Before the start of Season 82, NU successfully defended its ASEAN School Games title, in which they defeated Indonesia for the gold medal. During the season, they swept the elimination rounds, earning an outright spot in the Finals. The Bullpups then swept the FEU Baby Tamaraws in the Finals, with Quiambao contributing in Game 2 with eight points and seven rebounds. He was the only Bullpup on the Season 82 Mythical Team. He also finished third in the NBTC 24 rankings, with only San Beda forward Rhayyan Amsali and Tamayo ahead of him. His averages that season were 12.3 points, 9.8 rebounds (including 4.0 offensive rebounds per game), and 1.4 blocks per game in just under 23 minutes a game.

College career 
On August 1, 2020, he committed to play for the De La Salle Green Archers. Since there was no UAAP basketball during the COVID-19 pandemic, Quiambao stayed in shape by playing in Filipino basketball leagues in Dubai. Prior to Season 85, he got to play with DLSU in the PBA D-League and in the Filoil EcoOil Preseason Cup.

Season 85: Rookie of the Year 
Quiambao had an ugly start to his UAAP career, as he only had five points on 2-of-13 shooting and three steals in a loss to the UP Fighting Maroons. He bounced back with 11 points, three rebounds, three assists, and two steals against the UST Growling Tigers. In a loss to the UE Red Warriors, he had 15 points and six rebounds. The Archers bounced back from the loss with a win over the FEU Tamaraws, in which he had 16 points, eight rebounds, and four assists. Against NU, he had 15 points and six rebounds, but missed a corner triple in the clutch, leading to their first loss to NU in seven years. He then had 20 points and nine rebounds in an overtime loss to the Adamson Falcons. They then lost a rematch with FEU in which he had 12 points, eight rebounds, and four assists. After spending time with Gilas, he returned to help La Salle break UP's seven-game winning streak with 18 points (13 in the fourth quarter alone) and nine rebounds. For that performance, he was voted Player of the Week. He was unable to play in a crucial game against Adamson as he had tested positive for COVID-19, and La Salle did not make it to the Final Four. He was awarded Rookie of the Year with averages of 11.2 points, 6.5 rebounds, 3.2 assists, and 1.1 steals.

National team career

Junior national team 
Quiambao made his 3x3 debut during the 2019 FIBA 3x3 U-18 Asia Cup. They were eliminated in the quarterfinals by China.

Senior national team 
In 2021, Quiambao was invited to the Philippines men's national basketball team training pool, but he declined the invitation to fulfill requirements needed for his Grade 12 studies. He accepted the invite the following year as Gilas was preparing for the third window of qualifying for the 2023 FIBA World Cup. He played two games in the third window and four games in the 2022 FIBA Asia Cup, averaging a team-high 4.2 assists, with 6.0 points and 3.5 rebounds. He was also on the roster for the fifth and sixth windows.

Player profile 
In high school, he became known as a player who didn't need the ball to be effective, and a solid defender with his size. He has patterned his playing style after Nikola Jokić's as a playmaking big man, and has said that his goal is to become capable of playing not just the five position, but the four and three positions as well.

References

External links 

 Profile at FIBA website
 

2001 births
Living people
Filipino men's 3x3 basketball players
Filipino men's basketball players
Power forwards (basketball)
Philippines men's national basketball team players
Philippines national 3x3 basketball team players
De La Salle Green Archers basketball players
People from Muntinlupa
Centers (basketball)